John of St John (died  1253) was an English-born clergyman in Ireland who held office as Bishop of Ferns. 

He was born in England, and first came to Ireland in 1212 as a Royal clerk in the Exchequer of Ireland, whereby he gained great knowledge of the Irish public finances.  He was granted the manor of Newcastle Lyons in South Dublin. He was appointed bishop in 1223, being noteworthy as the first English  Bishop of Ferns, after an unsuccessful effort to make him Bishop of Ossory. He may have died in 1243, but it was more likely in 1253. 

He was Lord High Treasurer of Ireland 1217-1232, and a member of the Privy Council of Ireland from 1219, and was valued for his expert knowledge of the Irish finances. He visited England to discuss the state of Irish affairs with the English Crown. He also acted as a justice in eyre, and as Chief Escheator for Ireland.

He was a political figure of considerable importance until about 1236. In later life he rather faded from the public eye, and his precise date of death is uncertain, although it was probably in the summer of 1253.

References

13th-century Roman Catholic bishops in Ireland
1243 deaths
Bishops of Ferns